Ready is a song by American rapper Fabolous, released as a single on January 17, 2013. The song features American singer Chris Brown and was produced by The Runners and The Monarch. The song has since peaked at number 93 on the US Billboard Hot 100.

Background 
The song "Ready was recorded by Fabolous and singer Chris Brown in early 2012, over a year before its eventual release. Fabolous explained this was due to Chris Brown's altercation with former girlfriend Rihanna, he explained that he did not want the record to get caught up in the negativity of the situation. On January 15, 2013, Fabolous announced that the first official single from Loso's Way 2 would be "Ready". He described the song as a great radio record that can be very successful. Fabolous would say that he picked Chris Brown to do the hook because he thought he would be the best for the record.

Music video
On March 9, 2013, Fabolous and Chris Brown were in Malibu, California shooting the first part of the video and the second part of the video would be shot in the Dominican Republic. The music video was filmed by TAJ. On March 26 the first trailer was released featuring a cameo from Kevin Hart and on April 8 the second trailer featuring scenes shot in the Dominican Republic was released. The music video labeled a short film premiered on BET's 106 & Park on April 10, 2013. It features a cameo from Jessica White as Fabolous' love interest.

Chart performance

Weekly charts

Year-end charts

Certifications

References 

2013 singles
Fabolous songs
Chris Brown songs
Songs written by Chris Brown
Def Jam Recordings singles
2013 songs
Songs written by Fabolous
Songs written by Andre Davidson
Songs written by Sean Davidson
Song recordings produced by the Monarch (production team)
Songs written by Andrew Harr
Songs written by Jermaine Jackson (hip hop producer)
Song recordings produced by the Runners